Stephen Percy Lamb (born 2 October 1955) is a former English footballer who played as a midfielder.

Career
In 1971, Lamb joined Southend United as an apprentice. In 1973, Lamb signed a professional contract with Southend. In November 1975, Lamb joined Margate on loan. Lamb made seven Football League appearances at the club, before signing for Chelmsford City in 1976. Lamb spent two seasons at Chelmsford before departing. During the 1986–87 season, Lamb played for Barton Rovers.

References

1955 births
Living people
Association football midfielders
English footballers
People from Leigh-on-Sea
Southend United F.C. players
Margate F.C. players
Chelmsford City F.C. players
Barton Rovers F.C. players
English Football League players